Uncertain Glory may refer to:

 Uncertain Glory (novel), by the Catalan writer Joan Sales i Vallès
 Uncertain Glory (1944 film), a war crime drama starring Errol Flynn and Paul Lukas
 Uncertain Glory (2017 film), a Spanish drama based on the novel
 An Uncertain Glory: The Contradictions of Modern India, a 2013 book co-authored by Amartya Sen
 The Uncertain Glory, a book by Harriet Lummis Smith